Francis Joseph Kane (born October 30, 1942) is an American prelate of the Roman Catholic Church.  Kane served as an auxiliary bishop of the Archdiocese of Chicago in Illinois from 2003 to 2018.

Biography

Early life and education
Born on October 30, 1942, in Chicago, Illinois, Francis Kane attended Our Lady of Peace Elementary School and graduated from Archbishop Quigley Preparatory Seminary in Chicago in 1961. He then earned a Bachelor of Arts degree from Niles College in Chicago in 1963, and a Bachelor of Sacred Theology degree from St. Mary of the Lake Seminary in Mundelein, Illinois, in 1969.

Ordination and ministry
Kane was ordained to the priesthood by Cardinal John Cody at St. Mary of the Lake Seminary on May 14, 1969. He then served as associate pastor at St. John Fisher Parish in Chicago until 1975, and was also named associate director of the Center for Pastoral Ministry in 1973. 

Kane served as associate pastor at St. Nicholas of Tolentine Parish in Chicago from 1975 to 1979, and director of the Office for the Ministry of Peace and Justice (1979-1985) and director of the Office of Evangelization and Christian Life (1983-1993). Kane was director of Catholic Relief Services from 1982 to 1987. From 1993 to his appointment as auxiliary bishop in 2003, Kane served as pastor of St. Joseph Parish in Wilmette, Illinois. He also became dean of Deanery A in 1999, serving until 2003.

Auxiliary Bishop of Chicago
On January 24, 2003, Pope John Paul II appointed Kane as an auxiliary bishop of Chicago and titular bishop of Sault Sainte Marie. He was consecrated on March 19, 2003, by Cardinal Francis George, with Bishops Raymond Goedert and Ricardo Urquidi serving as co-consecrators, at Holy Name Cathedral in Chicago.

As an auxiliary bishop, Kane also served as episcopal vicar for Vicariate II and the cardinal's liaison for the Annual Catholic Appeal and for the Office for Lay Ecclesial Ministry. Kan was also a member of Aid for Women and the Parish Evaluation Project (PEP), and served on the board of directors of St. Joseph College Seminary in Chicago. Within the United States Conference of Catholic Bishops, Kane was a member of the Committee on Catholic Education and the Subcommittee on the Catholic Campaign for Human Development. He is a member of the Order of the Holy Sepulchre and Knights of Columbus.

On January 16, 2014, Kane made a public apology to victims of sexual abuse by priests in the archdiocese.  He said that the archdiocese had operated on the mistaken belief that abusive priests could be rehabilitated and safely returned to parish assignments with monitoring.  He said:We found out that isn't true, that was a mistake. We didn't realize the depth of this terrible, terrible sin and crime . . . child sex abuse.On July 3, 2018, Pope Francis accepted Kane's resignation as auxiliary bishop of the Archdiocese of Chicago after he'd reached the retirement age of 75.

See also
 

 Catholic Church hierarchy
 Catholic Church in the United States
 Historical list of the Catholic bishops of the United States
 List of Catholic bishops of the United States
 Lists of patriarchs, archbishops, and bishops

References

External links
 Roman Catholic Archdiocese of Chicago

1942 births
Living people
Clergy from Chicago
Loyola University Chicago alumni
University of Saint Mary of the Lake alumni
Roman Catholic Archdiocese of Chicago
21st-century American Roman Catholic titular bishops
Religious leaders from Illinois
Members of the Order of the Holy Sepulchre
Catholics from Illinois